The Dallas Times Herald, founded in 1888 by a merger of the Dallas Times and the Dallas Herald, was once one of two major daily newspapers serving the Dallas, Texas (USA) area. It won three Pulitzer Prizes, all for photography, and two George Polk Awards, for local and regional reporting.  As an afternoon publication for most of its 102 years, its demise was hastened by the shift of newspaper reading habits to morning papers, the reliance on television for late-breaking news, as well as the loss of an antitrust lawsuit against crosstown rival The Dallas Morning News after the latter's parent company bought the rights to 26 United Press Syndicate features that previously had been running in the Times Herald.

MediaNews Group bought the Times Herald from the Times Mirror Company in 1986; Times Mirror had owned the paper since 1969. MediaNews sold the paper in 1988 to a company formed by John Buzzetta, a former partner of MediaNews Group’s founder, Dean Singleton.

Roy E. Bode, who previously worked as Washington Bureau Chief of the paper and later as its associate editor, became its last editor-in-chief. Despite financial pressures, the Times Herald continued to operate its own news bureaus in Washington, Austin, Houston, San Antonio and other Texas cities, and did not layoff journalists during its final years. It also produced Pulitzer finalists and won other national journalism honors.
According to Burl Osborne, the former publisher of the Morning News, the Times Herald shut down on December 8, 1991. The next day, Belo Corporation, owner of the Morning News, bought the Times Herald assets for $55 million and sold the physical equipment to a variety of buyers to disperse the assets and thus prevent any other entity from easily re-establishing a competitive newspaper in Dallas.

Microfilm copies of the Dallas Times Herald can be found in the Dallas Public Library archival collection. The collection includes December 1855 – December 1991, with a gap from January through October 1886.

Awards

Pulitzer Prizes
1964 — Robert H. Jackson's photograph of Jack Ruby's murder of Lee Harvey Oswald
1980 — Erwin H. Hagler's feature photography for a series on the Western cowboy
1983 — James B. Dickman's feature photography of life and death in El Salvador

George Polk Awards
1978—local reporting
1982—Jim Henderson for regional reporting

Missouri Lifestyle Journalism Awards
1982 General Excellence

Notable former staff 
Skip Bayless, sports columnist and author, current Fox Sports personality
John Bloom, syndicated film critic (a.k.a. Joe Bob Briggs), writer, and actor (Casino)
Hector Cantu, co-creator, Baldo comic strip
Shelby Coffey III, editor and vice president
Lee Cullum, NPR and PBS commentator, columnist, and producer and host for KERA Television
Rodger Dean Duncan, bestselling author, Forbes magazine contributor 
Najlah Feanny, contract photographer for Newsweek
Mike Goldman, managing editor of Boys' Life magazine
A. C. Greene, journalist, author, television commentator, historian; editorial page editor at time of John F. Kennedy Assassination After sale of Times Herald and KRLD-TV to Los Angeles Times, became a major stockholder
 Paul Hagen, baseball writer and  recipient of the J. G. Taylor Spink Award from the Baseball Writers' Association of America 
Ray F. Herndon, UPI Vietnam War photojournalist and bureau chief, a finalist for the 1991 Pulitzer Prize for investigative reporting 
Molly Ivins, syndicated columnist and author
Robert H. Jackson (photographer) best known for his photo of Ruby shooting Oswald
Dan Jenkins, sportswriter and author
Tom Johnson, publisher
Iris Krasnow, best-selling author specializing in relationships and personal growth
Jim Lehrer, author and anchor of The NewsHour with Jim Lehrer on PBS; was a Times Herald reporter at the time of John F. Kennedy assassination
Margaret Mayer, who as chief of the Dallas Times-Herald's  Washington bureau became one of the first women to hold such a position.
Scott Monserud, sports editor, Denver Post
Mark Potok, reporter, spokesperson, Southern Poverty Law Center
Steven Reddicliffe, television critic
Don Safran, film critic, also a publicist for Columbia Pictures
Gaylord Shaw, managing editor, won 1978 Pulitzer Prize with Los Angeles Times
Blackie Sherrod, award-winning sports columnist and commentator, author of several sportsbooks
Bud Shrake, sportswriter, screenwriter, and author
Mickey Spagnola, writer for DallasCowboys.com
Bascom N. Timmons, later opened a news bureau in Washington to serve newspapers in several states 
Tara Weingarten, automotive journalist, Newsweek writer, founder of VroomGirls
Robert Wilonsky, entertainment reporter

References

Further reading 

 Cox, Patrick.  The First Texas News Barons.  Austin: University of Texas Press, 2005.  .
 

 Rogers, John William.  The Lusty Texans of Dallas, ch. XV.  New York: Dutton, 1960.
 Schutze, Jim (February 1992). "It Wasn't Murder. Was It Suicide?  What Really Killed the Herald,"  D Magazine. (Accessed Jan. 7, 2009, by free search of online archive.)
The WPA Dallas Guide and History.  Denton: University of North Texas Press, 1992.  .

In other media
  Report from August 1984 detailing the newspaper battle between the Dallas Times Herald and Dallas Morning News which was at full throttle during the Republican National Convention.
  Vivian Castleberry became the first female editor of the Dallas Times Herald in 1957.
  Narrated by Brad Sham, May 2013
  A conversation with Dallas Times Herald photographers William Allen, Eamon Kennedy, Bob Jackson, and Darryl Heikes, who covered President Kennedy's trip to Fort Worth and Dallas, his assassination, and the aftermath.

External links
 "Dallas Herald"  hosted by the Portal to Texas History.
 The Dallas Morning News, longtime rival and eventual acquirer
 
 
 Front cover of final edition of the Dallas Times Herald
Dallas Public Library, Dallas History and Archives Newspaper Holdings

Archived TV commercials
 Times Herald classified ad service, October 1978
 Times Herald promotion of new morning edition, 1982 with Mason Adams
 Times Herald ad with Dabney Coleman (voiced by Harold Gould)

Defunct newspapers of the Dallas–Fort Worth metroplex
Pulitzer Prize-winning newspapers